Charlotte Wilson was an English anarchist.

Charlotte Wilson may also refer to:

Charlotte Wilson (VSO), volunteer teacher murdered in Burundi
Charlotte Wilson (footballer), Australian footballer
Charlotte Day Wilson, musician